Zygmunt Józef Pawłowicz (November 18, 1927 – March 18, 2010) was the Polish Auxiliary bishop of the Roman Catholic Archdiocese of Gdańsk from 1985 until 2005. He was also ordained the titular bishop of Tamallula in 1985.

Born in Gdańsk, Pawłowicz was ordained a Catholic priest on September 20, 1952. He died on March 18, 2010, at the age of 82.

External links
Catholic Hierarchy: Bishop Zygmunt Józef Pawłowicz †

1927 births
2010 deaths
Polish Roman Catholic titular bishops
Clergy from Gdańsk
People from the Free City of Danzig